The 2008 Valencia Superbike World Championship round was the third round of the 2008 Superbike World Championship. It took take place on the weekend of April 4–6, 2008, at the Circuit Ricardo Tormo in Valencia, Spain.

Superbike race 1 classification

Superbike race 2 classification

Supersport race classification

External links
 Superbike Race 1 results
 Superbike Race 2 results
 Supersport Race results

Valencia
Valencia Superbike World Championship round
Superbike World Championship round